Bartosz Żukowski (born June 9, 1975, in Warsaw, Poland) is a Polish actor. He gained recognition as the actor playing the role of Waldek Kiepski in the Polsat Świat TV series Świat według Kiepskich.

Biography 
He lived in Miastkow Kościelny in Garwolin County. He is a graduate of the Theater Studio at the Ochota Theater in Warsaw. He studied at the PWST in Warsaw, but did not complete his studies. He also studied law at the European School of Law and Administration in Warsaw.

He was in a relationship with the star of the Ranczo series, Violetta Arlak. Then he married with Ewa Coll, with whom he is in the process of divorce. They have a daughter Pola (born December 20, 2009).

Filmography 

 1992: Pierścionek z orłem w koronie – Kosior's subordinate
 1993: Samowolka – waiter Grzelak
 1993: This Way for the Gas, Ladies and Gentlemen (Polish: Pożegnanie z Marią) – soldier
 1993: Palec boży (television show) – salesman
 1993: Dwa księżyce – son of Ludwis
 1994: Reverted (Polish: Zawrócony) – boy
 1994: Molly – Igor, Dominik's partner
 1995: Tato – director's assistant
 1995: Ekscelencja (television show) – Fałalej
 1995: At Full Gallop (Polish: Cwał) – laborer at the academy
 1996: Szamanka – AGH student
 1996: Nocne graffiti – soldier
 1996: Dom (television show) – student, Marek's friend
 1997: Wniebowstąpienie (television show) – young guy
 1998: Brand (television show) – Einar
 1999–2005, 2011: Świat według Kiepskich – Waldemar „Walduś / Cyc” Kiepski, Waldemar VI Kiepski, Waldemar Małolepszy
 1999: Pierwszy milion – Witold Hoffman
 1999: Krugerandy – Mucha
 2001: Szkoła obmowy (television show) – Józef
 2002: Gorący temat – Madman, Bończyk's fellow prisoner
 2003: Warszawa – Rysio, Misia's friend
 2003: Ubu Król – Józek
 2004: Książę nocy (television show) – Zbyszek Młotek
 2004: Atrakcyjny pozna panią... – mayor Wojtuś
 2005: Lawstorant – prisoner
 2005: Kryminalni – Dobi Bogucki
 2006: Just Love Me (Polish: Tylko mnie kochaj) – constable
 2006: Summer love – blond
 2006: Jasne błękitne okna – Kamil
 2006: Faceci do wzięcia – Mariusz Lipko, director of an advertising agency
 2006: Egzamin z życia – Żelowy, partner of Luiza Żerwe
 2006: Czeka na nas świat – Sproket, Piotr's friend
 2007: Tylko miłość – gangster Mariusz "Korba"
 2008: WW. II behind closed doors. Stalin, the nazis and the west – KGB officer
 2008: Skorumpowani – chemist Cygara
 2008: Pora mroku – Thorn
 2008: Niezawodny system – Mietek, assistant to the bailiff
 2009: Hel (film 2009) – Mały
 2009: The Dark House (Polish: Dom zły) – Hawryluk
 2010: Ojciec Mateusz – soldier of Łuczak
 2010: Nowa – Radosław Jawor 
 2011: Komisarz Alex – Mrówka 
 2011: Pierwsza miłość (television show) – jeweler Olaf Łęcki
 2012: Obława – Waniek
 2012: Hotel 52 – Jurek 
 2013: Świat Walerego – Olek
 2013: Traffic Department (Polish: Drogówka) – Wójcik
 2014: Ojciec Mateusz – Jaro 
 2015: These Daughters of Mine (Polish: Moje córki krowy) – healer
 2015: Komisarz Alex – Nowak 
 2016: Koronka – merchant
 2017: Serce nie sługa – lawyer
 2018: Zabawa zabawa – uncle of Magda
 2018: Trzecia połowa – player of the opposing team
 2018: Ojciec Mateusz – Andrzej Kowal 
 2018: Jak pokonać kaca – Łukasz
 2018: Audsajder – prisoner
 2019: Komisarz Alex – Edek Stefczak 
 2020: Raz, jeszcze raz – Mikser

References 

1975 births
Living people
Polish film actors
Actors from Warsaw
People from Garwolin County